The Medina of Essaouira, formerly Mogador, is a Medina quarter in Essaouira, Morocco. It was designated by the UNESCO a World Heritage Site in 2001.

History 
Essaouira is an exceptional example of a late-18th-century fortified town, built according to the principles of contemporary European military architecture in a North African context. Since its foundation, it has been a major international trading seaport, linking Morocco and its Saharan hinterland with Europe and the rest of the world.

Sources

References 

Essaouira
World Heritage Sites in Morocco